Viscount  was a Japanese conductor and composer of classical music. He was the younger brother of pre-war Japanese Prime Minister Fumimaro Konoe.

Biography
Konoye was born in Kōjimachi, Tokyo. He was the younger son of Duke Konoe Atsumaro, scion of one of the Five Regent Houses of the Fujiwara clan. The Konoe clan traditionally provided gagaku musicians to the Imperial Household. Despite this, Konoye pursued music over the objections of his family, who wished for him a career in politics. His decision was supported by his older brother, Fumimaro.

Konoye attended the Gakushuin Peers School, where he became a close friend of Takashi Inukai. In 1913, he entered the Tokyo University of the Arts, where he specialized in the violin. In 1915, he went to Germany briefly to study musical composition. On his return to Japan he became a pupil of Kosaku Yamada. His debut as a conductor was in 1920, with an amateur orchestra led by Tokichi Setoguchi. Konoye returned to Europe for further studies in 1923 in Paris under Vincent d'Indy and Berlin under Franz Schreker.
He also studied conducting under Erich Kleiber, and Karl Muck. In 1924, he conducted at the Berlin Philharmonic, and returned to Japan in the fall of the same year.

Konoye co-founded the Japan Symphonic Association in 1925, and the following year became conductor of the orchestra. Konoe later founded the New Symphony Orchestra of Tokyo (the present day NHK Symphony Orchestra), and helped mold the orchestra over a 10-year period into an ensemble that was praised as competitive with many of the better orchestras in Europe.

Today he is remembered for making the première recording of Mahler's Fourth Symphony, done in May 1930. It was also, aside from a cut in the third movement, the first electrical recording of any complete Mahler symphony.

Additionally, Konoye made numerous guest appearances in Europe and America, conducting some 90 different orchestras in the course of his career including the orchestra of La Scala, Milan and the NBC Symphony Orchestra. He created friendships with Erich Kleiber, Leopold Stokowski, Wilhelm Furtwängler and Richard Strauss. He went to Germany and conducted Berlin Philharmonic Orchestra in the second half of the 1930s. In the early days of the NBC Symphony, he planned an American tour under the supervision of Stokowski, but the project was cancelled due to World War II. 

In 1964 he performed Mozart's Clarinet Concerto with Benny Goodman.

Japanese premieres
Konoye conducted many notable Japanese premieres including:

 Richard Strauss: Serenade for Winds (1926)
 Paul Hindemith: Overture to Neues vom Tage (1927)
 Wolfgang Amadeus Mozart: Sinfonia Concertante for Four Winds (1927)
 Kurt Weill: Kleine Dreigroschenmusik (1929)
 Maurice Ravel: Ma mère l'Oye (1929)
 Richard Strauss: Oboe Concerto (with Otto Winter; 1962)
 Darius Milhaud: Oboe Concerto (with Heinz Holliger; 1970)

Composer and arranger
Konoye wrote original compositions, but was more deeply interested in arranging existing music, including, for example, Modest Mussorgsky's Pictures at an Exhibition and Schubert's String Quintet, which he orchestrated.

Major works
Kronungs-Kantate for soprano, mezzo-soprano, baritone, chorus and orchestra (1928)
Etenraku for orchestra (1931; arrangement of the gagaku piece of the same title)
Kimigayo (national anthem of Japan) for orchestra
Chin Chin Chidori for voice and piano

Notable recordings
 Mahler: Symphony No. 4 (Sakaye Kitasaya (soprano), New Symphony Orchestra of Tokyo; recorded by Japanese Parlophone in May 1930)

Ancestry

References

External links
Konoye Foundation of Music
Mozart : Sinfonia concertante KV 297b

1898 births
1973 deaths
20th-century classical composers
20th-century conductors (music)
20th-century Japanese composers
20th-century Japanese male musicians
Japanese classical composers
Japanese conductors (music)
Japanese male classical composers
Japanese male conductors (music)
Kazoku
Konoe family